The LPFP Awards are a number of awards given annually during the Portuguese League for Professional Football (LPFP) gala, and the winners are chosen by a vote amongst the LPFP pairs. Between 2006 and 2010 the winners were chosen only by a vote amongst the members of Sports National Press Club (CNID). Since 2011, thanks to new sponsorship agreements, all the awards related to football belong to LPFP and their associated.

These awards are given annually to players playing in Primeira Liga and Segunda Liga, as to managers and referees, the most prestigious one being the LPFP Primeira Liga Player of the Year.

Primeira Liga

Players

Coaches

Segunda Liga

Players

Coaches

See also
 LPFP Primeira Liga Player of the Year
 CNID Footballer of the Year
 List of Portuguese League Champions and Top Scorers

References

External links
 

Portuguese football trophies and awards
Annual events in Portugal